Westbahn may refer to:
 Westbahn (Austria), a railway line linking Vienna and Salzburg in Austria
 Westbahn (Hanover), a railway line in the German states of Lower Saxony and North Rhine-Westphalia
 Westbahn (Württemberg), a railway line in the German state of Württemberg
 WESTbahn, an Austrian railway train operating company
 Western Railway (disambiguation), various railways with the equivalent English language name